Tyler Moss (born December 27, 1998) is an American soccer player who currently plays for FC Tucson in the USL League One.

Career

College & Amateur
Moss attended California State University, Sacramento in 2017 to play college soccer. In four full seasons with the Hornets, Moss made 68 appearances and tallied eight assists. Moss was named Big West All-Academic in his Sophomore and Junior years, and named to the Big West All-Freshman team in his first year.

While at college, Moss competed in the USL League Two in both 2018 and 2019. He made 14 appearances for OKC Energy U23 in 2018, and four appearances for San Francisco Glens in 2019. In 2021, Moss played in the NPSL with FC Davis, going on to appear nine times for the team.

Professional

FC Tucson
On January 4, 2022, Moss signed with USL League One club FC Tucson ahead of their 2022 season. He made his professional debut on April 2, 2022, starting in a 4–0 loss to Richmond Kickers in which he was sent off in the 85th–minute.

References

1998 births
Living people
American soccer players
Association football defenders
National Premier Soccer League players
People from Carmichael, California
Sacramento State Hornets men's soccer players
San Francisco Glens players
Soccer players from California
FC Tucson players
USL League One players
USL League Two players